Stan Rogow is an American music manager, writer and producer of film and television.

Career
His television credits include Fame, Lizzie McGuire, Shannon's Deal, Flight 29 Down, Darcy's Wild Life, State of Grace, Nowhere Man, Valemont, and the internet series Gemini Division, Woke Up Dead and Afterworld. He also produced the television film Nowhere to Hide and the feature films The Clan of the Cave Bear, All I Want For Christmas, Men of War, and The Lizzie McGuire Movie.

Rogow was also an executive producer of Corbin Bleu's debut album Another Side. Rogow is also the father of actor Jackson Rogow.

Awards and nominations

As executive producer

Personal life
He is an alumnus of Boston University School of Law.

References

External links

American lawyers
American music industry executives
American web producers
American television writers
American male television writers
Boston University School of Law alumni
Living people
People from St. Petersburg, Florida
1955 births
Screenwriters from Florida
Film producers from Florida
Television producers from Florida